This article presents a timeline of the name Judea through an incomplete list of notable historical references to the name through the various time periods of the region.

Historical references
 733 BCE: Nimrud Tablet K.3751
 350 BCE: Yehud coinage
 1st-cent. CE: Aramaic Scroll of Antiochus: "…In the twenty-third year of his (Antiochus Eupator) reign, in the two-hundred and thirteenth year of the rebuilding of this, God's house (Temple), he put his face to go up to Jerusalem. He then answered and said to his nobles, 'Do you not know that the Jewish people in Judea, between us, they do not worship our God, nor do they practice our customs, and they leave off from following the king's religion for their own religion,' etc."  
 70 CE: Judaea Capta coinage
 76 CE: The Jewish War: Josephus describes Judea.
 76 CE: Josephus mentions Coreae, where travelers from the interior cross into Judea.
 78 CE: Pliny the Elder: Et hactenus Iudaea est.
 Pliny: "The rest of Judaea is divided into ten toparchies: Emmaus (Emmaum), Lydda (Lyddam), Joppa, Accrabim (Acrebitenam), Jufna (Gophaniticam), Timnath-serah (Thamniticam), Bethleptephenem, Orinen (the Hills), Jerusalem and Herodium."  
 c. 92 CE: Josephus writes in his Antiquities: "Arabia is a country that borders on Judea."
 c. 129 or 135: Syria Palæstina was a Roman province between 135 and about 390. It was established by the merge of Roman Syria and Roman Judaea, shortly before or after the Bar Kokhba Revolt. The historical consensus is the name was given to erase Jewish connection to the land.
 189 CE: The Mishnah: "Three countries are to be distinguished in what concerns the law of removal [of seventh year produce once the growing season has past]: Judea, beyond Jordan and Galilee."
 392: Epiphanius of Salamis, On Weights and Measures: "So [Hadrian] passed through the city of Antioch and passed through [Coele-Syria] and Phoenicia and came to Palestine — which is also called Judea — forty-seven years after the destruction of Jerusalem."
 c. 1130, Fetellus, "The city of Jerusalem is situated in the hill-country of Judea, in the province of Palestine" 
 1746: Modern History Or the Present State of All Nations: "Palestine, or the Holy Land, sometimes also called Judea, is bound by Mount Libanus on the north; by Arabia Deserta on the east; by Arabia Petrea on the south; and by the Mediterranean Sea on the west"

Biblical references
The name occurs multiple times as a geographic region in the Hebrew Bible, in both Hebrew and Aramaic:
 Daniel 2:25, 5:13, 6:13
 Ezra 5:1, 7:14 and the "province Judah" 5:8
 Nehemiah 11:3

During the time of the New Testament, the region was a Roman province. The name Judea occurs 44 times in the New Testament.

See also
 Judea (Roman province)

Bibliography

Notes

References

Judea, Timeline of the name
Judea, Timeline of the name
Judea, Timeline of the name
Palestinian history timelines
Israel history-related lists